Naseem Lodhi (born 15 September 1948) is a Pakistani politician  who was a Member of the Provincial Assembly of the Punjab, from 2002 to May 2018.

Early life and education
She was born on 15 September 1948 in Lahore.

She earned the degree of the Bachelor of Business Administration in 2002.

Political career

She was elected to the Provincial Assembly of the Punjab as a candidate for Pakistan Muslim League (Q) (PML-Q) on a reserved seat for women in 2002 Pakistani general election and remained Provincial Minister of Punjab for Population Welfare from November 2003 to 2007.

She was re-elected to the Provincial Assembly of the Punjab as a candidate for PML-Q on a reserved seat for women in 2008 Pakistani general election.

She was re-elected to the Provincial Assembly of the Punjab as a candidate for Pakistan Muslim League (N) on a reserved seat for women in 2013 Pakistani general election.

References

Living people
Women members of the Provincial Assembly of the Punjab
Punjab MPAs 2013–2018
1948 births
Pakistan Muslim League (N) politicians
Punjab MPAs 2008–2013
Punjab MPAs 2002–2007
21st-century Pakistani women politicians